USC&GS Guide was the name of two United States Coast and Geodetic Survey ships, and may refer to:

, a survey ship in service from 1923 to 1941
, a survey ship in service from 1941 to 1942

Guide